The 2023 Nigerian Senate elections were held on 25 February 2023 in all 109 senatorial districts where voters elected senators using first-past-the-post voting. The last regular senatorial elections for all districts were in 2019.

Other federal elections, including the elections to the House of Representatives and the presidential election, were also held on the same date while state elections will be held two weeks afterwards on 11 March. The winners of these Senate elections will serve beginning in the 10th Nigerian National Assembly. The APC have held a majority in the Senate since the 2015 elections and solidified that majority in 2019.

Background
After the 2015–2019 Senate term led by President of the Senate Bukola Saraki (Peoples Democratic Party) and with a slight All Progressives Congress majority, the 2019 elections were categorized by a large shift back towards the APC and the defeats of multiple high-profile senators—including Saraki. As in the House of Representatives, the APC solidified its majority after nearly losing it due to defections in 2018.

At the opening of the 9th Nigeria National Assembly, Ahmad Lawan (APC-Yobe North) was elected as Senate President and Ovie Omo-Agege (APC-Delta Central) became Deputy Senate President as the party avoided the internal struggles that led Saraki and Ike Ekweremadu to take those offices in 2015. Enyinnaya Abaribe (PDP-Abia South) became the Senate Minority Leader. During the first two years of the 2019–2023 term, the APC expanded its majority through the defections of six formerly PDP senators but in the second half of the term, both parties were hit by several defections as party primaries for 2023 neared along with three APC resignations. More defections occurred in the wake of party primaries as senators decamped to new parties (mainly in order to run for re-election), most notably Abaribe who resigned as Minority Leader and joined APGA to run for re-election after withdrawing from the Abia PDP gubernatorial primary.

From the perspective of the APC, analysts viewed the 9th Senate as a change from the legislature versus executive disputes that were commonplace during the 8th Senate but critics derided the chamber as a rubber stamp that lacked the initiative to advocate for itself against the executive branch. In terms of specific major bills, the Senate was noted for passing the Sexual Harassment Bill in July 2020, the Finance Bill 2020 in December 2020, the Petroleum Industry Bill in July 2021, a new Electoral Act in January 2022, dozens of constitutional amendments and the Proceeds of Crime Bill in March 2022, and an Electoral Act amendment in May 2022 as well as being commended for rejecting former Buhari aide Lauretta Onochie's nomination to INEC. On the other hand, it was criticized for voting down constitutional amendments for mandating women slots in legislatures and diaspora voting along with the continuous stalling of a key gender equality bill and rampant misappropriation of public funds. The senate was also accused of dereliction of oversight duty after several ministerial nominees were either barely questioned or asked to "take a bow" and go without questioning at confirmation hearings.

Retirements
In total, 31 senators—including 17 APC senators, one NNPP senator, 12 PDP senators, and one YPP senator—decided to retire, 22 of whom are seeking another office.

Abia Central: Theodore Orji (PDP) retired.
Adamawa Central: Aishatu Dahiru Ahmed (APC) retired to run for governor of Adamawa State.
Akwa Ibom North-East: Bassey Albert Akpan (YPP) retired to run for governor of Akwa Ibom State.
Akwa Ibom North-West: Chris Ekpenyong (PDP) retired.
Akwa Ibom South: Akon Eyakenyi (PDP) retired.
Bauchi Central: Halliru Dauda Jika (NNPP) retired to run for governor of Bauchi State.
Benue North-West: Emmanuel Yisa Orker-Jev (PDP) retired.
Cross River Central: Sandy Ojang Onor (PDP) retired to run for governor of Cross River State.
Cross River South: Gershom Bassey (PDP) retired to unsuccessfully run for governor of Cross River State.
Delta Central: Ovie Omo-Agege (APC) retired to run for governor of Delta State.
Delta South: James Manager (PDP) retired to unsuccessfully run for governor of Delta State.
Ebonyi Central: Joseph Ogba (PDP) retired to unsuccessfully run for governor of Ebonyi State.
Enugu North: Utazi Chukwuka (PDP) retired.
Enugu West: Ike Ekweremadu (PDP) retired to unsuccessfully run for governor of Enugu State.
Imo West: Rochas Okorocha (APC) retired to unsuccessfully run for president.
Jigawa North-East: Ibrahim Hassan Hadejia (APC) is retired unsuccessfully run for governor of Jigawa State. 
Kaduna Central: Uba Sani (APC) retired to run for governor of Kaduna State.
Kogi Central: Yakubu Oseni (APC) retired.
Lagos Central: Oluremi Tinubu (APC) retired.
Lagos West: Solomon Olamilekan Adeola (APC) retired to run for senator for Ogun West.
Ogun Central: Ibikunle Amosun (APC) retired to unsuccessfully run for president.
Ondo North: Robert Ajayi Boroffice (APC) retired to unsuccessfully run for president.
Oyo Central: Teslim Folarin (APC) retired to run for governor of Oyo State.
Plateau Central: Hezekiah Ayuba Dimka (APC) retired to unsuccessfully run for governor of Plateau State.
Rivers East: Betty Apiafi (PDP) retired.
Rivers East: George Thompson Sekibo (PDP) retired to unsuccessfully run for governor of Rivers State.
Sokoto East: Abdullahi Ibrahim Gobir (APC) retired to unsuccessfully run for governor of Sokoto State.
Taraba Central: Yusuf Abubakar Yusuf (APC) retired to unsuccessfully run for governor of Taraba State.
Taraba South: Emmanuel Bwacha (APC) retired to run for governor of Taraba State.
Yobe North: Ahmad Lawan (APC) is retired to unsuccessfully run for president.

Zamfara West: Lawali Hassan Anka (APC) retired.

Resignations
Three seats will be vacant on the day of the election due to resignations, none of which will be filled until the next Senate.

Borno North: Abubakar Kyari (APC) resigned on 12 April 2022 to become APC Deputy National Chairman (North).
Nasarawa West: Abdullahi Adamu (APC) resigned on 12 April 2022 to become APC National Chairman.
Zamfara Central: Hassan Nasiha (APC) resigned on 23 February 2022 to become Deputy Governor of Zamfara State.

Incumbents withdrew

From primary elections 
Six incumbents withdrew from primary elections. However, three of the senators later decamped from their original party and won the nomination of their new party.

Edo North: Francis Alimikhena (then-APC) withdrew from the primary election. However, Alimikhena defected to the PDP and became its (disputed) senatorial nominee.
Jigawa North-West: Danladi Abdullahi Sankara (APC) withdrew from the primary election.
Kebbi Central: Adamu Aliero (then-APC) withdrew from the primary election. However, Aliero defected to the PDP and became its (disputed) senatorial nominee.
Nasarawa North: Godiya Akwashiki (then-APC) withdrew from the primary election. However, Akwashiki defected to the SDP and became its senatorial nominee.
Ogun East: Ramoni Olalekan Mustapha (APC) withdrew from the primary election.
Plateau South: Nora Daduut withdrew from the primary election.

From nomination 
One incumbent withdrew from their nomination.

Borno Central: Kashim Shettima (APC) won renomination but withdrew from the nomination to become the APC nominee for vice president.

Incumbents defeated

In primary elections 
Twenty incumbents (12 APC senators and 8 PDP senators) lost in primary elections. After the primary elections, three of the senators (2 APC senators and 1 PDP senator) defected to new parties with two of the senators (one each in the APC and PDP) then winning the nomination of the new party.

Bauchi North: Adamu Muhammad Bulkachuwa (APC) lost renomination to Siraj Ibrahim Tanko Muhammad. Bulkachuwa later defected to the PDP.

Bayelsa Central: Moses Cleopas (PDP) lost renomination to Konbowei Benson.
Edo South: Matthew Urhoghide (PDP) lost renomination to Matthew Iduoriyekemwen.
Ekiti North: Olubunmi Ayodeji Adetunmbi (APC) lost renomination to Cyril Fasuyi.
Gombe South: Amos Bulus Kilawangs (APC) lost renomination to Joshua M. Lidani.

Imo North: Chukwuma Frank Ibezim (APC) lost renomination to Patrick Ndubueze.
Kaduna South: Danjuma Laah (PDP) lost renomination to Sunday Marshall Katunɡ.
Katsina Central: Kabir Abdullahi Barkiya (APC) lost renomination to Abdul'aziz Musa Yar'adua.
Katsina South: Bello Mandiya (APC) lost renomination to Mohammed Muntari Dandutse.
Kogi West: Smart Adeyemi (APC) lost renomination to Sunday Karimi.
Kwara Central: Ibrahim Yahaya Oloriegbe (APC) lost renomination to Saliu Mustapha.
Niger North: Aliyu Sabi Abdullahi (APC) lost renomination to Abubakar Sani Bello.
Ogun West: Tolu Odebiyi (APC) lost renomination to Solomon Olamilekan Adeola.
Ondo Central: Patrick Ayo Akinyelure (PDP) lost renomination to Ifedayo Adedipe.
Ondo South: Nicholas Tofowomo (PDP) lost renomination to Agboola Ajayi.
Osun West: Adelere Adeyemi Oriolowo (APC) lost renomination to Raheem Amidu Tadese.
Oyo South: Mohammed Kola Balogun (APC) lost nomination to Sharafadeen Alli.
Plateau North: Istifanus Gyang (PDP) lost renomination to Simon Mwadkwon.

In general elections 
Twenty-one incumbents (10 APC senators, one NNPP senator, and 10 PDP senators) lost in general elections.

Anambra Central: Uche Ekwunife (PDP) lost re-election to Victor Umeh (LP).
Anambra North: Stella Oduah (PDP) lost re-election to Tony Nwoye (LP).
Bauchi South: Lawal Yahaya Gumau (NNPP) lost re-election to Shehu Buba Umar (APC).
Bayelsa East: Biobarakuma Degi (APC) lost re-election to Benson Agadaga (PDP).
Benue North-East: Gabriel Suswam (PDP) lost re-election to Emmanuel Memga Udende (APC).
Delta North: Peter Nwaoboshi (APC) lost re-election to Ned Nwoko (PDP).
Ebonyi North: Sam Egwu (PDP) lost re-election to Onyekachi Nwaebonyi (APC).
Ebonyi South: Michael Ama Nnachi (PDP) lost re-election to Dave Umahi (APC).
Edo Central: Clifford Ordia (PDP) lost re-election to Monday Okpebholo (APC).
Edo North: Francis Alimikhena (PDP) lost re-election to Adams Oshiomhole (APC).
Ekiti South: Abiodun Olujimi (PDP) lost re-election to Raphael Adeyemi Adaramodu (APC).
Federal Capital Territory: Philips Tanimu Aduda (PDP) lost re-election to Ireti Kingibe (LP).
Gombe North: Sa'idu Ahmed Alkali (APC) lost re-election to Ibrahim Hassan Dankwambo (PDP).
Jigawa South-West: Mohammed Sabo Nakudu (APC) lost re-election to Mustapha Khabeeb (PDP).
Kaduna North: Suleiman Abdu Kwari (APC) lost re-election to Khalid Mustapha (PDP).
Kano South: Kabiru Ibrahim Gaya (APC) lost re-election to Suleiman Abdurrahman Kawu Sumaila (NNPP).
Katsina North: Ahmad Babba Kaita (PDP) lost re-election to Nasiru Sani Zangon Daura (APC).
Kebbi South: Bala Ibn Na'allah (APC) lost re-election to Garba Musa Maidoki (PDP).
Nasarawa South: Umaru Tanko Al-Makura (APC) lost re-election to Mohammed Ogoshi Onawo (PDP).
Niger South: Muhammad Bima Enagi (APC) lost re-election to Peter Ndalikali Jiya (PDP).
Osun Central: Ajibola Basiru (APC) lost re-election to Olubiyi Fadeyi (PDP).

Results

National

Summary

Principal officers' races

Timeline

23–24 February 2019 – The All Progressives Congress wins the 2019 Nigerian Senate election, the Peoples Democratic Party stayed as the main minority party, and the Young Progressives Party entered the Senate as a smaller minority party.
11 June 2019 – Most senators officially sworn into office. Ahmad Lawan (APC-Yobe North) and Ovie Omo-Agege (APC-Delta Central) elected as Senate President and Deputy Senate President, respectively.
2 July 2019 – Other principal officers were announced with Yahaya Abubakar Abdullahi (APC-Kebbi North) and Orji Uzor Kalu (APC-Abia North) becoming Majority Leader and Majority Whip, respectively. In the minority, Enyinnaya Abaribe (PDP-Abia South) became Senate Minority Leader while Philips Tanimu Aduda (PDP-Federal Capital Territory) was named Minority Whip.
June 2019 to January 2020 – In the months after the election, litigation and supplemental elections led to the inauguration of several new senators, with some replacing previously sworn-in senators while others filled open seats.
21 June 2022 – Philips Tanimu Aduda (PDP-FCT) becomes Minority Leader after Abia South Senator Enyinnaya Abaribe resigned from the position before defecting to APGA. Utazi Chukwuka (PDP-Enugu North) replaces Aduda as Minority Whip.
11 May 2022 – Abdullahi Ibrahim Gobir (APC-Sokoto East) becomes Majority Leader after Kebbi North Senator Yahaya Abubakar Abdullahi resigned from the position before defecting to the PDP.

Changes

Abia State

Adamawa State

Akwa Ibom State

Anambra State

Bauchi State

Bayelsa State

Benue State

Borno State

Cross River State

Delta State

Ebonyi State

Edo State

Ekiti State

Enugu State

Federal Capital Territory

Gombe State

Imo State

Jigawa State

Kaduna State

Kano State

Katsina State

Kebbi State

Kogi State

Kwara State

Lagos State

Nasarawa State

Niger State

Ogun State

Ondo State

Osun State

Oyo State

Plateau State

Rivers State

Sokoto State

Taraba State

Yobe State

Zamfara State

Notes

References

Senate
 
2023 in Nigeria
February 2023 events in Africa
Election and referendum articles with incomplete results